The United States has developed many space programs since the beginning of the spaceflight era in the mid-20th century. The government runs space programs by three primary agencies: NASA for civil space; the Department of Defense for military space; and the Intelligence Community for space-based intelligence, surveillance, and reconnaissance assets. These entities have invested significant resources to advance technological approaches to meet objectives. In the late 1980s, commercial interests emerged in the space industry and have expanded dramatically especially within the last 10to 15 years.

NASA delivers the most visible elements of the U.S. space portfolio. From crewed space exploration and the Apollo 11 landing on the moon, to the Space Shuttle, International Space Station, Voyager, the Mars rovers, many space telescopes, and the Artemis program, NASA delivers on the civil space exploration mandate. NASA also cooperates with other U.S. civil agencies such as the National Oceanic and Atmospheric Administration (NOAA) and the U.S. Geological Survey (USGS) to deliver space assets supporting the weather and civil remote sensing mandates of those organizations. In 2022, NASA's annual budget was approximately $24 billion.

The Department of Defense delivers the military space programs. In 2019, the U.S. Space Force started as the primary DoD agent for delivery of military space capability. Systems such as the Global Positioning System, which is ubiquitous to users worldwide, was developed and is maintained by the DoD. Missile warning, defense weather, military satellite communications, and space domain awareness also acquire significant annual investment. In 2023, the annual DoD budget request focused on space is $24.5 billion dollars.

The Intelligence Community, through entities that include the National Reconnaissance Office (NRO), invests significant resources in space. Surveillance and reconnaissance are the primary focuses of these entities.

Commercial space activity in the United States was facilitated by the passage of the Commercial Space Launch Act in October 1984. Commercial crewed program activity was spurred by the establishment of the $10 million Ansari X Prize in May 1996.

Definition of space flight 
Space programs of the United States date to the start of the Space Age in the late 1940s and early 1950s. Programs involve both crewed systems and uncrewed satellites, probes and platforms to meet diverse program objectives. 

From a definition perspective, the criteria for what constitutes spaceflight vary. This article follows the US definition of spaceflight. Similarly, for uncrewed missions, systems are required to travel above the same altitude thresholds.

Government-led programs 
The following summarizes the major space programs where the United States government plays a leadership role in managing program delivery.

Crewed government-led programs

Uncrewed government-led programs

Commercial space programs 
The following summarizes the major space programs where private interests play the leadership role in managing program delivery.

Crewed commercial programs

Uncrewed commercial programs

See also 

 Space policy of the United States

Explanatory notes

References 

 
United States
United States space programs